Lawrence Battam  (May 1, 1876 – January 27, 1938), was a professional baseball player who played third base in the Major Leagues for the 1895 New York Giants. His minor league career stretched through 1903.

External links

1876 births
1938 deaths
Major League Baseball third basemen
Baseball players from New York (state)
New York Giants (NL) players
19th-century baseball players
Schenectady Dorpians players
Torrington Tornadoes players
Paterson Silk Weavers players
New York Metropolitans (minor league) players
Philadelphia Athletics (minor league) players
Reading Actives players
Pawtucket Phenoms players
Springfield Ponies players
Springfield Maroons players
Rome Romans players
Taunton Herrings players
Newark Colts players
Derby Lushers players
Reading Coal Heavers players
Jersey City Skeeters players
Harrisburg Ponies players
New Haven Blues players
New London Whalers players
Hartford Senators players
Minor league baseball managers
Burials at Holy Cross Cemetery, Brooklyn